Hypostomus paucimaculatus is a species of catfish in the family Loricariidae. It is native to South America, where it occurs in the upper and middle Suriname River basin in Suriname. The species reaches 12 cm (4.7 inches) in standard length and is believed to be a facultative air-breather.

References 

Fish of South America
Fish of Suriname
Fish described in 1968
paucimaculatus